The South Newcastle Lions is an Australian rugby league football club based in Merewether, New South Wales formed in 1910. They currently play in the Newcastle Rugby League competition. Rivalries are Central Newcastle, Western Suburbs and Lakes United.

Notable Juniors
Paul Merlo (1977-84 Penrith Panthers, Western Suburbs Magpies & Cronulla Sharks)
Shane Gray (2013- Gold Coast Titans)
Chanel Mata'utia (2014- Newcastle Knights)
Sione Mata'utia (2014- Newcastle Knights)
Lachlan Fitzgibbon (2015- Newcastle Knights)
Pat Mata'utia (2016- Newcastle Knights)
Tevita Pangai Junior (2016- Brisbane Broncos)
Ben Simmons (2016- Philadelphia 76ers)

See also

References

External links
 

Rugby clubs established in 1910
1910 establishments in Australia
Rugby league teams in Newcastle, New South Wales